Events in the year 1996 in  Turkey.

Parliament
20th Parliament of Turkey

Incumbents
President – Süleyman Demirel
Prime Minister –
Tansu Çiller (up to 6 March)
Mesut Yılmaz (6 March-28 June)
Necmettin Erbakan (from 28 June)
Leader of the opposition –
Mesut Yılmaz (up to 6 March)
Necmettin Erbakan (6 March-28 March)
Mesut Yılmaz (from 28 June)

Ruling party and the main opposition
 Ruling party 
True Path Party (DYP)
Motherland Party (ANAP)
Welfare Party (RP)

 Main opposition 
 Motherland Party (ANAP) (from 6 March)
Welfare Party (RP) (6 March-28 June)
Motherland Party (ANAP) (from 28 June)

Cabinet
52nd government of Turkey (up to 6 March)
53rd government of Turkey (6 March −28 June)
54th government of Turkey (from 28 June)

Events
16 January – The Panamanian ferry MV Avrasya was hijacked by pro-Chechen separatists
29 January – Beginning of Kardak crises between Turkey and Greece
8 February – BirgenAir accident 189 deaths
 6 March – A coalition government (ANAP and DYP)
4 April – Novelist Yaşar Kemal was awarded (Prix Méditerranée Étranger)
21 May – Fenerbahçe won the championship of the Turkish football league
24 May – After corruption accuses Tansu Çiller the chairman of DYP announced that DYP will end the coalition’ 
2 June – By local elections
June 3/14 – Habitat II (conference)
14 June – Operation against militants
28 June – New coalition government (RP and DYP)
10 July – Türksat 1C satellite
17 July – According to Fortune (magazine), Koç Holding was one of the 500 greatest companies of the World
October 2/8 – Prime minister Erbakan's African tour. His visit to Libya caused sharp reactions
24 October – Osmaniye Province was established
3 November – Susurluk car crash
10 November – NTV Turkey launched. 
25 November – Mesut Yılmaz was wounded in Badapest. This event was probably connected to Susurluk scandal

Births
2 January – Sıla Saygı, female ice skater
6 February – Emel Dereli, female track and field athlete competing in shot put
15 April – İpek Soylu , female tennis player
27 August – Ebru Topçu, female footballer
7 September - Anzujaamu, female cosplayer

Deaths
9 January – Özdemir Sabancı (born in 1941), industrialist (assassinated)
28 January – Müfide İlhan, first female city mayor 
19 January – Kasım Gülek (born in 1905), politician
25 February – Vehbi Koç (born in 1901), industrialist 
23 May – Tanju Okan (born in 1938), singer
28 July – Ömer Lütfü Topal (born in 1942), casino owner
29 August – Aliye Rona (born in 1921), actress
24 September – Zeki Müren (born in 1931), singer
3 November – Abdullah Çatlı (born in 1956), agent

Gallery

See also
Turkey at the 1996 Summer Olympics 
1995-96 1.Lig
Turkey in the Eurovision Song Contest 1996

References

 
Years of the 20th century in Turkey
1990s in Turkey
Turkey
Turkey
Turkey